"Because It's Love" is a song by European-American pop group The Kelly Family. It was produced by Kathy and Paddy Kelly as the lead single for their eleventh studio album Growin' Up (1997) and features lead vocals by Angelo and Paddy. The CD single contains an inedit version of "Sweetest Angel" sung by Barby Kelly, which was also featured on The Kelly Family's next album, From their Hearts (1998).

Track listings

Charts

Weekly charts

Year-end charts

References

External links
 KellyFamily.de — official site

1997 songs
The Kelly Family songs